Marc López and Lamine Ouahab were the defending champions; however, López chose to not participate this year.
Ouahab partnered up with Adrián Menéndez; however, they lost against Harsh Mankad and Adil Shamasdin in the first round.
Pablo Andújar and Flavio Cipolla won in the final 6–2, 6–2, against Oleksandr Dolgopolov Jr. and Artem Smirnov.

Seeds

Draw

Draw

External links
 Doubles Draw

Morocco Tennis Tour - Meknes - Doubles
2010 Morocco Tennis Tour
2010 Doubles